The Edinburgh Rambler is a 1997 album by Ed Miller.

Track listing
 Home Away From Home (Tommy Sands/Ed Miller) - 3:58
 The Rigs o'Rye (Traditional) - 4:56
 The Edinburgh Rambler (Ewan MacColl/Ed Miller) - 4:23
 Muir & the Master Builder (Brian McNeill-Grian Music) - 4:46
 Room for Us All in the Dance (Ian Davidson)- 4:50
 Free Wheelin' Now (Jim Reid) - 3:08
 Same Old Story (Alan Reid-Kinmor Music) - 3:47
 The Shearin's No' for You (Traditional) - 4:08
 The Silver Darlins (Brian McNeill & Dougie Pincock) / I Hae Laid a Herrin' in Saut (Traditional) - 2:44
 Scots Wha Hae (Robert Burns) - 2:37
 The Teacher's Rant (Ian Davidson) - 2:21
 The Green & the Blue (Alan Reid - Kinmor Music) - 3:55
 The Devil Made Texas / The Irish Washerwoman / The Lads o' Duns / Duns Dings A' (all Traditional) - 4:38

1997 albums
Ed Miller (Scottish folk musician) albums